William T. Ligon Jr. (born April 3, 1961) is an American former politician. He served in the Georgia State Senate as the senator from the 3rd district between 2011 and 2021.

After Joe Biden won Georgia in the 2020 presidential election, Ligon pushed for a special session of the Georgia General Assembly to overturn Georgia's presidential election results.

References

1961 births
Living people
People from Brunswick, Georgia
21st-century American politicians
Republican Party Georgia (U.S. state) state senators